The 1904 California Golden Bears football team was an American football team that represented the University of California, Berkeley during the 1904 college football season. The team competed as an independent under head coach James Hopper and compiled a record of 6–1–1. This marked the team's inaugural season at California Field.

Schedule

References

California
California Golden Bears football seasons
California Golden Bears football